Chionodes powelli is a moth in the family Gelechiidae. It is found in North America, where it has been recorded from California, Oregon, Washington, Texas, Oklahoma, Arkansas, Louisiana, Mississippi and Florida.

The larvae feed on Quercus lobata, Quercus kelloggii and Quercus garryana.

References

Chionodes
Moths described in 1999
Moths of North America